The Darragh Building, also known as the DARCO Building, is a historic commercial building at 1403 East 6th Street in Little Rock, Arkansas.  It is a single-story building with an office component and a warehouse component.  The office component is built using modern post and beam construction, and has walls composed of concrete panel and floor-to-ceiling windows.  Both it and its stairs are set on recessed platforms, giving it the appearance that it is floating.  It was built in 1958 to a design by Noland Blass, Jr., and is a good example of Mid-Century Modern commercial architecture.

The building was listed on the National Register of Historic Places in 2017.

See also
National Register of Historic Places listings in Little Rock, Arkansas

References

Industrial buildings and structures on the National Register of Historic Places in Arkansas
Buildings and structures completed in 1958
Buildings and structures in Little Rock, Arkansas
National Register of Historic Places in Little Rock, Arkansas